"My Way" is a song by Dominican singer Henry Santos. It was released on January 9, 2013, and served as the first single for his second album My Way (2013). It became Santos's first single to hit number one on the Billboard Tropical Airplay chart. The music video was released on February 14, 2013.

Charts

See also
 List of Billboard Tropical Airplay number ones of 2013

References

2013 songs
2013 singles
Henry Santos songs
Universal Music Latin Entertainment singles